Lugar is a name for a type of country subdivision in Portugal and Spain.

Spain 
As a general rule, the term  indicates the related population entity that has or has had a jurisdictional term.

References

Types of administrative division
Portuguese words and phrases
Subdivisions of Portugal